Getoor is a surname. Notable people with the surname include: 

 Lise Getoor, American computer scientist, daughter of Ronald
 Ronald Getoor (1929–2017), American mathematician, father of Lise